The Finland national under-16 and under-17 basketball team is a national basketball team of Finland, administered by Basketball Finland.
It represents the country in men's international under-16 and under-17 basketball competitions.

FIBA U16 European Championship participations

FIBA Under-17 Basketball World Cup participations

See also
Finland men's national basketball team
Finland men's national under-19 basketball team
Finland women's national under-16 basketball team

References

External links
Archived records of Finland team participations

Finland national basketball teams
Men's national under-17 basketball teams
Basketball